Enkitta Mothathe is a 1990 Tamil language romantic action drama film,  directed by  R. Sundarrajan and produced by Raajeshwari Sundarrajan. The film stars Vijayakanth, Shobhana and Khushbu.

Plot summary
Saroja loves Pandian and wants to marry him. Meanwhile, Mallika, an arrogant wealthy girl, also falls in love with Pandian and plots to cause a rift between Saroja and him. Will Mallika be victorious in her attempt or not is what the story culminates into.

Cast

Vijayakanth as Pandiyan
Shobhana as Mallika
Khushbu as Saroja
Radha Ravi
Nizhalgal Ravi
Vadivukkarasi as Saroja's Mother
Manorama as Pandiyan's Mother
Thyagu
Vennira Aadai Moorthy
Raja in a Guest Appearance
Sarath Kumar as Military Kandhan
Idichapuli Selvaraj
Kullamani
Gundu Kalyanam

Pasi Narayanan
Balu Anand as Mutton shop owner

Soundtrack

The music was composed by Ilaiyaraaja and lyrics were written by Vaali and Pulamaipithan. The song "Sariyo Sariyo" was a reused version of "Puzhoyarathil" from the Malayalam film Adharvam.

References

External links
 
 

1990 films
Films scored by Ilaiyaraaja
1990s Tamil-language films
Films directed by R. Sundarrajan
Films with screenplays by Panchu Arunachalam